In logic, philosophy and related fields, mereology ( (root: , mere-, 'part') and the suffix -logy, 'study, discussion, science') is the study of parts and the wholes they form.  Whereas set theory is founded on the membership relation between a set and its elements, mereology emphasizes the meronomic relation between entities, which—from a set-theoretic perspective—is closer to the concept of inclusion between sets.

Mereology has been explored in various ways as applications of predicate logic to formal ontology, in each of which mereology is an important part. Each of these fields provides its own axiomatic definition of mereology. A common element of such axiomatizations is the assumption, shared with inclusion, that the part-whole relation orders its universe, meaning that everything is a part of itself (reflexivity), that a part of a part of a whole is itself a part of that whole (transitivity), and that two distinct entities cannot each be a part of the other (antisymmetry), thus forming a poset.  A variant of this axiomatization denies that anything is ever part of itself (irreflexivity) while accepting transitivity, from which antisymmetry follows automatically.

Although mereology is an application of mathematical logic, what could be argued to be a sort of "proto-geometry", it has been wholly developed by logicians, ontologists, linguists, engineers, and computer scientists, especially those working in artificial intelligence. In particular, mereology is also on the basis for a point-free foundation of geometry (see for example the quoted pioneering paper of Alfred Tarski and the review paper by Gerla 1995).

In general systems theory, mereology refers to formal work on system decomposition and parts, wholes and boundaries (by, e.g., Mihajlo D. Mesarovic (1970), Gabriel Kron (1963), or Maurice Jessel (see Bowden (1989, 1998)). A hierarchical version of Gabriel Kron's Network Tearing was published by Keith Bowden (1991), reflecting David Lewis's ideas on gunk. Such ideas appear in theoretical computer science and physics, often in combination with sheaf theory, topos, or category theory. See also the work of Steve Vickers on (parts of) specifications in computer science, Joseph Goguen on physical systems, and Tom Etter (1996, 1998) on link theory and quantum mechanics.

History
Informal part-whole reasoning was consciously invoked in metaphysics and ontology from Plato (in particular, in the second half of the Parmenides) and Aristotle onwards, and more or less unwittingly in 19th-century mathematics until the triumph of set theory around 1910. Metaphysical ideas of this era that discuss the concepts of parts and wholes include divine simplicity and the classical conception of beauty.

Ivor Grattan-Guinness (2001) sheds much light on part-whole reasoning during the 19th and early 20th centuries, and reviews how Cantor and Peano devised set theory. It appears that the first to reason consciously and at length about parts and wholes was Edmund Husserl, in 1901, in the second volume of Logical Investigations – Third Investigation: "On the Theory of Wholes and Parts" (Husserl 1970 is the English translation). However, the word "mereology" is absent from his writings, and he employed no symbolism even though his doctorate was in mathematics.

Stanisław Leśniewski coined "mereology" in 1927, from the Greek word μέρος (méros, "part"), to refer to a formal theory of part-whole he devised in a series of highly technical papers published between 1916 and 1931, and translated in Leśniewski (1992). Leśniewski's student Alfred Tarski, in his Appendix E to Woodger (1937) and the paper translated as Tarski (1984), greatly simplified Leśniewski's formalism. Other students (and students of students) of Lesniewski elaborated this "Polish mereology" over the course of the 20th century. For a good selection of the literature on Polish mereology, see Srzednicki and Rickey (1984). For a survey of Polish mereology, see Simons (1987). Since 1980 or so, however, research on Polish mereology has been almost entirely historical in nature.

A. N. Whitehead planned a fourth volume of Principia Mathematica, on geometry, but never wrote it. His 1914 correspondence with Bertrand Russell reveals that his intended approach to geometry can be seen, with the benefit of hindsight, as mereological in essence. This work culminated in Whitehead (1916) and the mereological systems of Whitehead (1919, 1920).

In 1930, Henry S. Leonard completed a Harvard Ph.D. dissertation in philosophy, setting out a formal theory of the part-whole relation. This evolved into the "calculus of individuals" of Goodman and Leonard (1940). Goodman revised and elaborated this calculus in the three editions of Goodman (1951). The calculus of individuals is the starting point for the post-1970 revival of mereology among logicians, ontologists, and computer scientists, a revival well-surveyed in Simons (1987), Casati and Varzi (1999), and Cotnoir and Varzi (2021).

Axioms and primitive notions

Reflexivity: A basic choice in defining a mereological system, is whether to consider things to be parts of themselves. In naive set theory a similar question arises: whether a set is to be considered a "subset" of itself. In both cases, "yes" gives rise to paradoxes analogous to Russell's paradox: Let there be an object O such that every object that is not a proper part of itself is a proper part of O. Is O a proper part of itself? No, because no object is a proper part of itself; and yes, because it meets the specified requirement for inclusion as a proper part of O. In set theory, a set is often termed an improper subset of itself. Given such paradoxes, mereology requires an axiomatic formulation.

A mereological "system" is a first-order theory (with identity) whose universe of discourse consists of wholes and their respective parts, collectively called objects. Mereology is a collection of nested and non-nested axiomatic systems, not unlike the case with modal logic.

The treatment, terminology, and hierarchical organization below follow Casati and Varzi (1999: Ch. 3) closely. For a more recent treatment, correcting certain misconceptions, see Hovda (2008). Lower-case letters denote variables ranging over objects. Following each symbolic axiom or definition is the number of the corresponding formula in Casati and Varzi, written in bold.

A mereological system requires at least one primitive binary relation (dyadic predicate). The most conventional choice for such a relation is parthood (also called "inclusion"), "x is a part of y", written Pxy. Nearly all systems require that parthood partially order the universe. The following defined relations, required for the axioms below, follow immediately from parthood alone:
An immediate defined predicate is "x is a proper part of y", written PPxy, which holds (i.e., is satisfied, comes out true) if Pxy is true and Pyx is false. Compared to parthood (which is a partial order), ProperPart is a strict partial order.
 3.3
An object lacking proper parts is an atom. The mereological universe consists of all objects we wish to think about, and all of their proper parts:
Overlap: x and y overlap, written Oxy, if there exists an object z such that Pzx and Pzy both hold.
 3.1
The parts of z, the "overlap" or "product" of x and y, are precisely those objects that are parts of both x and y.
Underlap: x and y underlap, written Uxy, if there exists an object z such that x and y are both parts of z.
 3.2
Overlap and Underlap are reflexive, symmetric, and intransitive.

Systems vary in what relations they take as primitive and as defined. For example, in extensional mereologies (defined below), parthood can be defined from Overlap as follows:
 3.31

The axioms are:
Parthood partially orders the universe:
M1, Reflexive: An object is a part of itself.
 P.1
M2, Antisymmetric: If Pxy and Pyx both hold, then x and y are the same object.
 P.2
M3, Transitive: If Pxy and Pyz, then Pxz.
 P.3
M4, Weak Supplementation: If PPxy holds, there exists a z such that Pzy holds but Ozx does not.
 P.4 

M5, Strong Supplementation: If Pyx does not hold, there exists a z such that Pzy holds but Ozx does not.
 P.5

M5', Atomistic Supplementation: If Pxy does not hold, then there exists an atom z such that Pzx holds but Ozy does not.
 P.5' 

Top: There exists a "universal object", designated W, such that PxW holds for any x.
 3.20
Top is a theorem if M8 holds.

Bottom: There exists an atomic "null object", designated N, such that PNx holds for any x.
 3.22

M6, Sum: If Uxy holds, there exists a z, called the "sum" or "fusion" of x and y, such that the objects overlapping of z are just those objects that overlap either x or y.
 P.6
M7, Product: If Oxy holds, there exists a z, called the "product" of x and y, such that the parts of z are just those objects that are parts of both x and y.
 P.7
If Oxy does not hold, x and y have no parts in common, and the product of x and y is undefined.
M8, Unrestricted Fusion: Let φ(x) be a first-order formula in which x is a free variable. Then the fusion of all objects satisfying φ exists.
 P.8
M8 is also called "General Sum Principle", "Unrestricted Mereological Composition", or "Universalism". M8 corresponds to the principle of unrestricted comprehension of naive set theory, which gives rise to Russell's paradox. There is no mereological counterpart to this paradox simply because parthood, unlike set membership, is reflexive.

M8', Unique Fusion: The fusions whose existence M8 asserts are also unique. P.8' 
M9, Atomicity: All objects are either atoms or fusions of atoms.
 P.10

Various systems
Simons (1987), Casati and Varzi (1999) and Hovda (2008) describe many mereological systems whose axioms are taken from the above list. We adopt the boldface nomenclature of Casati and Varzi. The best-known such system is the one called classical extensional mereology, hereinafter abbreviated CEM (other abbreviations are explained below). In CEM, P.1 through P.8'  hold as axioms or are theorems. M9, Top, and Bottom are optional.

The systems in the table below are partially ordered by inclusion, in the sense that, if all the theorems of system A are also theorems of system B, but the converse is not necessarily true, then B includes A. The resulting Hasse diagram is similar to Fig. 3.2 in Casati and Varzi (1999: 48).

There are two equivalent ways of asserting that the universe is partially ordered: Assume either M1-M3, or that Proper Parthood is transitive and asymmetric, hence a strict partial order. Either axiomatization results in the system M. M2 rules out closed loops formed using Parthood, so that the part relation is well-founded. Sets are well-founded if the axiom of regularity is assumed. The literature contains occasional philosophical and common-sense objections to the transitivity of Parthood.

M4 and M5 are two ways of asserting supplementation, the mereological analog of set complementation, with M5 being stronger because M4 is derivable from M5. M and M4 yield minimal mereology, MM. Reformulated in terms of Proper Part, MM is Simons's (1987) preferred minimal system.

In any system in which M5 or M5' are assumed or can be derived, then it can be proved that two objects having the same proper parts are identical. This property is known as Extensionality, a term borrowed from set theory, for which extensionality is the defining axiom. Mereological systems in which Extensionality holds are termed extensional, a fact denoted by including the letter E in their symbolic names.

M6 asserts that any two underlapping objects have a unique sum; M7 asserts that any two overlapping objects have a unique product. If the universe is finite or if Top is assumed, then the universe is closed under Sum. Universal closure of Product and of supplementation relative to W requires Bottom. W and N are, evidently, the mereological analog of the universal and empty sets, and Sum and Product are, likewise, the analogs of set-theoretical union and intersection. If M6 and M7 are either assumed or derivable, the result is a mereology with closure.

Because Sum and Product are binary operations, M6 and M7 admit the sum and product of only a finite number of objects. The Unrestricted Fusion axiom, M8, enables taking the sum of infinitely many objects. The same holds for Product, when defined. At this point, mereology often invokes set theory, but any recourse to set theory is eliminable by replacing a formula with a quantified variable ranging over a universe of sets by a schematic formula with one free variable. The formula comes out true (is satisfied) whenever the name of an object that would be a member of the set (if it existed) replaces the free variable. Hence any axiom with sets can be replaced by an axiom schema with monadic atomic subformulae. M8 and M8' are schemas of just this sort. The syntax of a first-order theory can describe only a denumerable number of sets; hence, only denumerably many sets may be eliminated in this fashion, but this limitation is not binding for the sort of mathematics contemplated here.

If M8 holds, then W exists for infinite universes. Hence, Top need be assumed only if the universe is infinite and M8 does not hold. Top (postulating W) is not controversial, but Bottom (postulating N) is. Leśniewski rejected Bottom, and most mereological systems follow his example (an exception is the work of Richard Milton Martin). Hence, while the universe is closed under sum, the product of objects that do not overlap is typically undefined. A system with W but not N is isomorphic to:
 a Boolean algebra lacking a 0;
 a join semilattice bounded from above by 1. Binary fusion and W interpret join and 1, respectively.
Postulating N renders all possible products definable, but also transforms classical extensional mereology into a set-free model of Boolean algebra.

If sets are admitted, M8 asserts the existence of the fusion of all members of any nonempty set. Any mereological system in which M8 holds is called general, and its name includes G. In any general mereology, M6 and M7 are provable. Adding M8 to an extensional mereology results in general extensional mereology, abbreviated GEM; moreover, the extensionality renders the fusion unique. On the converse, however, if the fusion asserted by M8 is assumed unique, so that M8' replaces M8, then—as Tarski (1929) had shown—M3 and M8' suffice to axiomatize GEM, a remarkably economical result. Simons (1987: 38–41) lists a number of GEM theorems.

M2 and a finite universe necessarily imply Atomicity, namely that everything either is an atom or includes atoms among its proper parts. If the universe is infinite, Atomicity requires M9. Adding M9 to any mereological system, X results in the atomistic variant thereof, denoted AX. Atomicity permits economies, for instance, assuming that M5' implies Atomicity and extensionality, and yields an alternative axiomatization of AGEM.

Set theory
The notion of "subset" in set theory is not entirely the same as the notion of "subpart" in mereology. Stanisław Leśniewski rejected set theory as related to but not the same as nominalism. For a long time, nearly all philosophers and mathematicians avoided mereology, seeing it as tantamount to a rejection of set theory. Goodman too was a nominalist, and his fellow nominalist Richard Milton Martin employed a version of the calculus of individuals throughout his career, starting in 1941.

Much early work on mereology was motivated by a suspicion that set theory was ontologically suspect, and that Occam's razor requires that one minimise the number of posits in one's theory of the world and of mathematics. Mereology replaces talk of "sets" of objects with talk of "sums" of objects, objects being no more than the various things that make up wholes.

Many logicians and philosophers reject these motivations, on such grounds as: 
 They deny that sets are in any way ontologically suspect
 Occam's razor, when applied to abstract objects like sets, is either a dubious principle or simply false
 Mereology itself is guilty of proliferating new and ontologically suspect entities such as fusions.
For a survey of attempts to found mathematics without using set theory, see Burgess and Rosen (1997).

In the 1970s, thanks in part to Eberle (1970), it gradually came to be understood that one can employ mereology regardless of one's ontological stance regarding sets. This understanding is called the "ontological innocence" of mereology. This innocence stems from mereology being formalizable in either of two equivalent ways:
Quantified variables ranging over a universe of sets
Schematic predicates with a single free variable.
Once it became clear that mereology is not tantamount to a denial of set theory, mereology became largely accepted as a useful tool for formal ontology and metaphysics.

In set theory, singletons are "atoms" that have no (non-empty) proper parts; many consider set theory useless or incoherent (not "well-founded") if sets cannot be built up from unit sets. The calculus of individuals was thought to require that an object either have no proper parts, in which case it is an "atom", or be the mereological sum of atoms. Eberle (1970), however, showed how to construct a calculus of individuals lacking "atoms", i.e., one where every object has a "proper part" (defined below) so that the universe is infinite.

There are analogies between the axioms of mereology and those of standard Zermelo–Fraenkel set theory (ZF), if Parthood is taken as analogous to subset in set theory. On the relation of mereology and ZF, also see Bunt (1985). One of the very few contemporary set theorists to discuss mereology is Potter (2004).

Lewis (1991) went further, showing informally that mereology, augmented by a few ontological assumptions and plural quantification, and some novel reasoning about singletons, yields a system in which a given individual can be both a part and a subset of another individual. Various sorts of set theory can be interpreted in the resulting systems. For example, the axioms of ZFC can be proven given some additional mereological assumptions.

Forrest (2002) revises Lewis's analysis by first formulating a generalization of CEM, called "Heyting mereology", whose sole nonlogical primitive is Proper Part, assumed transitive and antireflexive. There exists a "fictitious" null individual that is a proper part of every individual. Two schemas assert that every lattice join exists (lattices are complete) and that meet distributes over join. On this Heyting mereology, Forrest erects a theory of pseudosets, adequate for all purposes to which sets have been put.

Mathematics
Husserl never claimed that mathematics could or should be grounded in part-whole rather than set theory. Lesniewski consciously derived his mereology as an alternative to set theory as a foundation of mathematics, but did not work out the details. Goodman and Quine (1947) tried to develop the natural and real numbers using the calculus of individuals, but were mostly unsuccessful; Quine did not reprint that article in his Selected Logic Papers. In a series of chapters in the books he published in the last decade of his life, Richard Milton Martin set out to do what Goodman and Quine had abandoned 30 years prior. A recurring problem with attempts to ground mathematics in mereology is how to build up the theory of relations while abstaining from set-theoretic definitions of the ordered pair. Martin argued that Eberle's (1970) theory of relational individuals solved this problem.

Topological notions of boundaries and connection can be married to mereology, resulting in mereotopology; see Casati and Varzi (1999: ch. 4,5). Whitehead's 1929 Process and Reality contains a good deal of informal mereotopology.

Natural language
Bunt (1985), a study of the semantics of natural language, shows how mereology can help understand such phenomena as the mass–count distinction and verb aspect. But Nicolas (2008) argues that a different logical framework, called plural logic, should be used for that purpose.
Also, natural language often employs "part of" in ambiguous ways (Simons 1987 discusses this at length). Hence, it is unclear how, if at all, one can translate certain natural language expressions into mereological predicates. Steering clear of such difficulties may require limiting the interpretation of mereology to mathematics and natural science. Casati and Varzi (1999), for example, limit the scope of mereology to physical objects.

Metaphysics 
In metaphysics there are many troubling questions pertaining to parts and wholes. One question addresses constitution and persistence, another asks about composition.

Mereological constitution 
In metaphysics, there are several puzzles concerning cases of mereological constitution, that is, what makes up a whole.  There is still a concern with parts and wholes, but instead of looking at what parts make up a whole, the emphasis is on what a thing is made of, such as its materials, e.g., the bronze in a bronze statue. Below are two of the main puzzles that philosophers use to discuss constitution.

Ship of Theseus:  Briefly, the puzzle goes something like this. There is a ship called the Ship of Theseus. Over time, the boards start to rot, so we remove the boards and place them in a pile. First question, is the ship made of the new boards the same as the ship that had all the old boards? Second, if we reconstruct a ship using all of the old planks, etc. from the Ship of Theseus, and we also have a ship that was built out of new boards (each added one-by-one over time to replace old decaying boards), which ship is the real Ship of Theseus?

Statue and Lump of Clay:  Roughly, a sculptor decides to mold a statue out of a lump of clay. At time t1 the sculptor has a lump of clay. After many manipulations at time t2 there is a statue. The question asked is, is the lump of clay and the statue (numerically) identical? If so, how and why?

Constitution typically has implications for views on persistence:  how does an object persist over time if any of its parts (materials) change or are removed, as is the case with humans who lose cells, change height, hair color, memories, and yet we are said to be the same person today as we were when we were first born. For example, Ted Sider is the same today as he was when he was born—he just changed. But how can this be if many parts of Ted today did not exist when Ted was just born? Is it possible for things, such as organisms to persist? And if so, how? There are several views that attempt to answer this question. Some of the views are as follows (note, there are several other views):

(a) Constitution view. This view accepts cohabitation. That is, two objects share exactly the same matter. Here, it follows, that there are no temporal parts.

(b) Mereological essentialism, which states that the only objects that exist are quantities of matter, which are things defined by their parts. The object persists if matter is removed (or the form changes); but the object ceases to exist if any matter is destroyed.

(c) Dominant Sorts. This is the view that tracing is determined by which sort is dominant; they reject cohabitation. For example, lump does not equal statue because they're different "sorts".

(d) Nihilism—which makes the claim that no objects exist, except simples, so there is no persistence problem.

(e) 4-dimensionalism or temporal parts (may also go by the names perdurantism or exdurantism), which roughly states that aggregates of temporal parts are intimately related. For example, two roads merging, momentarily and spatially, are still one road, because they share a part.

(f) 3-dimensionalism (may also go by the name endurantism), where the object is wholly present. That is, the persisting object retains numerical identity.

Mereological composition 
One question that is addressed by philosophers is which is more fundamental: parts, wholes, or neither? Another pressing question is called the special composition question (SCQ):  For any Xs, when is it the case that there is a Y such that the Xs compose Y? This question has caused philosophers to run in three different directions:  nihilism, universal composition (UC), or a moderate view (restricted composition). The first two views are considered extreme since the first denies composition, and the second allows any and all non-spatially overlapping objects to compose another object. The moderate view encompasses several theories that try to make sense of SCQ without saying 'no' to composition or 'yes' to unrestricted composition.

Fundamentality 
There are philosophers who are concerned with the question of fundamentality. That is, which is more ontologically fundamental the parts or their wholes. There are several responses to this question, though one of the default assumptions is that the parts are more fundamental. That is, the whole is grounded in its parts. This is the mainstream view. Another view, explored by Schaffer (2010) is monism, where the parts are grounded in the whole. Schaffer does not just mean that, say, the parts that make up my body are grounded in my body. Rather, Schaffer argues that the whole cosmos is more fundamental and everything else is a part of the cosmos. Then, there is the identity theory which claims that there is no hierarchy or fundamentality to parts and wholes. Instead wholes are just (or equivalent to) their parts. There can also be a two-object view which says that the wholes are not equal to the parts—they are numerically distinct from one another. Each of these theories has benefits and costs associated with them.

Special composition question (SCQ) 
Philosophers want to know when some Xs compose something Y. There are several kinds of responses:

One response to this question is called nihilism. Nihilism states that there are no mereological complex objects (read:  composite objects); there are only simples.  Nihilists do not entirely reject composition because they do think that simples compose themselves, but this is a different point. More formally Nihilists would say: Necessarily, for any non-overlapping Xs, there is an object composed of the Xs if and only if there is only one of the Xs. This theory, though well explored, has its own set of problems. Some of which include, but are not limited to: experiences and common sense, incompatible with atomless gunk, and it is unsupported by space-time physics.
Another prominent response is called universal composition (UC). UC says that so long as the Xs do not spatially overlap, the Xs can compose a complex object. Universal compositionalists are also considered those who support unrestricted composition. More formally: Necessarily, for any non-overlapping Xs, there is a Y such that Y is composed of the Xs. For example, someone's left thumb, the top half of another person's right shoe, and a quark in the center of their galaxy can compose a complex object according to universal composition. Likewise, this theory also has some issues, most of them dealing with our experiences that these randomly chosen parts make up a complex whole and there are far too many objects posited in our ontology.
A third response (perhaps less explored than the previous two) includes a range of restricted composition views. Though there are several views, they all share a common idea:  that there is a restriction on what counts as a complex object: some (but not all) Xs come together to compose a complex Y. Some of these theories include:

(a) Contact—the Xs compose a complex Y if and only if the Xs are in contact;

(b) Fastenation—the Xs compose a complex Y if and only if the Xs are fastened;

(c) Cohesion—the Xs compose a complex Y if and only if the Xs cohere (cannot be pulled apart or moved in relation to each other without breaking);

(d) Fusion—the Xs compose a complex Y if and only if the Xs are fused (fusion is when the Xs are joined together such that there is no boundary);

(e) Organicism—the Xs compose a complex Y if and only if either the activities of the Xs constitute a life or there is only one of the Xs; and

(f) Brutal Composition—"It's just the way things are." There is no true, nontrivial, and finitely long answer.

This is not an exhaustive list as many more hypotheses continue to be explored. However, a common problem with these theories is that they are vague. It remains unclear what "fastened" or "life" mean, for example. But there are many other issues within the restricted composition responses—though many of them are subject to which theory is being discussed.

 A fourth response is called deflationism. Deflationism states that there is variance on how the term "exist" is used, and thus all of the above answers to the SCQ can be correct when indexed to a favorable meaning of "exist." Further, there is no privileged way in which the term "exist" must be used. There is therefore no privileged answer to the SCQ, since there are no privileged conditions for when X composes Y. Instead, the debate is reduced to a mere verbal dispute rather than a genuine ontological debate. In this way, the SCQ is part of a larger debate in general ontological realism and anti-realism. While deflationism successfully avoids the SCQ, it is not devoid of problems. It comes with the cost of ontological anti-realism such that nature has no objective reality at all. For, if there is no privileged way to objectively affirm the existence of objects, nature itself must have no objectivity.

Important surveys 
The books by Simons (1987) and Casati and Varzi (1999) differ in their strengths:
Simons (1987) sees mereology primarily as a way of formalizing ontology and metaphysics. His strengths include the connections between mereology and:
The work of Stanisław Leśniewski and his descendants
Various continental philosophers, especially Edmund Husserl
Contemporary English-speaking technical philosophers such as Kit Fine and Roderick Chisholm
Recent work on formal ontology and metaphysics, including continuants, occurrents, class nouns, mass nouns, and ontological dependence and integrity
Free logic as a background logic
Extending mereology with tense logic and modal logic
Boolean algebras and lattice theory.
Casati and Varzi (1999) see mereology primarily as a way of understanding the material world and how humans interact with it. Their strengths include the connections between mereology and:
 A "proto-geometry" for physical objects
 Topology and mereotopology, especially boundaries, regions, and holes
 A formal theory of events
 Theoretical computer science
 The writings of Alfred North Whitehead, especially his Process and Reality and work descended therefrom.

Simons devotes considerable effort to elucidating historical notations. The notation of Casati and Varzi is often used. Both books include excellent bibliographies. To these works should be added Hovda (2008), which presents the latest state of the art on the axiomatization of mereology.

See also
 Finitist set theory
 Gunk (mereology)
 Implicate and explicate order according to David Bohm
 Laws of Form by G. Spencer-Brown
 Mereological essentialism
 Mereological nihilism
 Mereotopology
 Meronomy
 Meronymy
 Monad (philosophy)
 Plural quantification
 Quantifier variance
 Simple (philosophy)
 Whitehead's point-free geometry
 Composition (objects)

References

Sources
 Bowden, Keith, 1991. Hierarchical Tearing: An Efficient Holographic Algorithm for System Decomposition, Int. J. General Systems, Vol. 24(1), pp 23–38.
 Bowden, Keith, 1998. Huygens Principle, Physics and Computers. Int. J. General Systems, Vol. 27(1-3), pp. 9–32.
 Bunt, Harry, 1985. Mass terms and model-theoretic semantics. Cambridge Univ. Press.
 Burgess, John P., and Rosen, Gideon, 1997. A Subject with No Object. Oxford Univ. Press.
 Burkhardt, H., and Dufour, C.A., 1991, "Part/Whole I: History" in Burkhardt, H., and Smith, B., eds., Handbook of Metaphysics and Ontology. Muenchen: Philosophia Verlag.
 Casati, Roberto, and Varzi, Achille C., 1999. Parts and Places: the structures of spatial representation. MIT Press.
 Cotnoir, A. J., and Varzi, Achille C., 2021, Mereology, Oxford University Press.
 Eberle, Rolf, 1970. Nominalistic Systems. Kluwer.
 Etter, Tom, 1996. Quantum Mechanics as a Branch of Mereology in Toffoli T., et al., PHYSCOMP96, Proceedings of the Fourth Workshop on Physics and Computation, New England Complex Systems Institute.
 Etter, Tom, 1998. Process, System, Causality and Quantum Mechanics. SLAC-PUB-7890, Stanford Linear Accelerator Centre.
 Forrest, Peter, 2002, "Nonclassical mereology and its application to sets", Notre Dame Journal of Formal Logic 43: 79–94.
 Gerla, Giangiacomo, (1995). "Pointless Geometries", in Buekenhout, F., Kantor, W. eds., "Handbook of incidence geometry: buildings and foundations". North-Holland: 1015–31.
 Goodman, Nelson, 1977 (1951). The Structure of Appearance. Kluwer.
 Goodman, Nelson, and Quine, Willard, 1947, "Steps toward a constructive nominalism", Journal of Symbolic Logic 12: 97-122.
 Gruszczynski, R., and Pietruszczak, A., 2008, "Full development of Tarski's geometry of solids", Bulletin of Symbolic Logic 14: 481–540. A system of geometry based on Lesniewski's mereology, with basic properties of mereological structures.
 Hovda, Paul, 2008, "What is classical mereology?" Journal of Philosophical Logic 38(1): 55–82.
 Husserl, Edmund, 1970. Logical Investigations, Vol. 2. Findlay, J.N., trans. Routledge.
 Kron, Gabriel, 1963, Diakoptics: The Piecewise Solution of Large Scale Systems. Macdonald, London.
 Lewis, David K., 1991. Parts of Classes. Blackwell.
 Leonard, H. S., and Goodman, Nelson, 1940, "The calculus of individuals and its uses", Journal of Symbolic Logic 5: 45–55.
 Leśniewski, Stanisław, 1992. Collected Works. Surma, S.J., Srzednicki, J.T., Barnett, D.I., and Rickey, V.F., editors and translators. Kluwer.
Lucas, J. R., 2000. Conceptual Roots of Mathematics. Routledge. Ch. 9.12 and 10 discuss mereology, mereotopology, and the related theories of A.N. Whitehead, all strongly influenced by the unpublished writings of David Bostock.
 Mesarovic, M.D., Macko, D., and Takahara, Y., 1970, "Theory of Multilevel, Hierarchical Systems". Academic Press.
 Nicolas, David, 2008, "Mass nouns and plural logic", Linguistics and Philosophy 31(2): 211–44.
 Pietruszczak, Andrzej, 1996, "Mereological sets of distributive classes", Logic and Logical Philosophy 4: 105–22. Constructs, using mereology, mathematical entities from set theoretical classes.
 Pietruszczak, Andrzej, 2005, "Pieces of mereology", Logic and Logical Philosophy 14: 211–34. Basic mathematical properties of Lesniewski's mereology.
 Pietruszczak, Andrzej, 2018, Metamerology, Nicolaus Copernicus University Scientific Publishing House.
 Potter, Michael, 2004.  Set Theory and Its Philosophy. Oxford Univ. Press.
 Simons, Peter, 1987 (reprinted 2000). Parts: A Study in Ontology. Oxford Univ. Press.
 Srzednicki, J. T. J., and Rickey, V. F., eds., 1984. Lesniewski's Systems: Ontology and Mereology. Kluwer.
 Tarski, Alfred, 1984 (1956), "Foundations of the Geometry of Solids" in his Logic, Semantics, Metamathematics: Papers 1923–38. Woodger, J., and Corcoran, J., eds. and trans. Hackett.
 Varzi, Achille C., 2007, "Spatial Reasoning and Ontology: Parts, Wholes, and Locations" in Aiello, M. et al., eds., Handbook of Spatial Logics. Springer-Verlag: 945–1038.
 Whitehead, A. N., 1916, "La Theorie Relationiste de l'Espace", Revue de Metaphysique et de Morale 23: 423–454. Translated as Hurley, P.J., 1979, "The relational theory of space", Philosophy Research Archives 5: 712–741.
------, 1919. An Enquiry Concerning the Principles of Natural Knowledge. Cambridge Univ. Press. 2nd ed., 1925.
------, 1920. The Concept of Nature. Cambridge Univ. Press. 2004 paperback, Prometheus Books. Being the 1919 Tarner Lectures delivered at Trinity College, Cambridge.
------, 1978 (1929). Process and Reality. Free Press.
 Woodger, J. H., 1937. The Axiomatic Method in Biology. Cambridge Univ. Press.

External links

Internet Encyclopedia of Philosophy:
"Material Composition" – David Cornell
Stanford Encyclopedia of Philosophy:
"Mereology" – Achille Varzi
"Boundary" – Achille Varzi

 
Mathematical logic
Ontology
Predicate logic
Semantic relations